Sage Francis discography.

Studio albums

Sick of Mixtapes
 Sick of Waiting... (1999)
 Still Sick... Urine Trouble (2000)
 Sick of Waiting Tables (2001)
 Sick of Waging War (2002)
 Sickly Business (2004)
 Still Sickly Business (2005)
 Sick of Wasting (2009)
 Sick to D(eat)th (2013)

Live albums
 Dead Poet Live Album (2004)
 Road Tested (2003–2005) (2005)

EPs
 Bounce / Drop Bass (1999) as Non-Prophets
 All Word, No Play (2000) as Non-Prophets
 Sage Frenchkiss (2002)
 Climb Trees (2002)
 Makeshift Patriot (2003)
 Damage (2004) as Non-Prophets
 Slow Down Gandhi (2004)
 Sea Lion (2005)

DVDs
 Life Is Easy (2005)

Guest appearances
 Sixtoo - "Testimony" from A Work in Progress (2001)
 Sixtoo - "When Freedom Rings" from Songs I Hate (And Other People Moments) (2001)
 Sole - "My Head Hurts" from "Salt on Everything" (2002)
 Double Deez - "Try Your Best" from Swedish Ish EP (2002)
 Atmosphere - "A Song We Made With Sage" from "Trying to Find a Balance" (2003)
 DJ Signify - "Kiddie Litter" "Haunted House Party" "Cup of Regret" from Sleep No More (2004)
 Bad Religion - "Let Them Eat War" from The Empire Strikes First (2004)
 Pellarin - "Fashion" from Teeth (2004)
 Molemen - "Follow Me" from Ritual of the Molemen (2004)
 Joey Beats - "Love, Love, Love" from "Love, Love, Love" (2005)
 Mr. Nogatco - "Live Dissection" from Nogatco Rd. (2006)
 Buddy Wakefield - "I Got Gone" from Run on Anything (2006)
 Mac Lethal - "Rapz of Death" from The Love Potion Collection 3 (2006)
 Macromantics - "Locksmith" from Moments in Movement (2006)
 B. Dolan - "Heart Failure" from The Failure (2008)
 Prolyphic & Reanimator - "Survive Another Winter" from The Ugly Truth (2008) 
 The Grouch and Eligh - "Worried About the World" from Say G&E! (2009)
 B. Dolan - "House Of Bees" "Paid Dues" "Sea Legs" "Survived Another Winter" from House of Bees Vol. 1 (2009)
 Sole and the Skyrider Band - "Progress Trap" from Hello Cruel World (2011)
 Scroobius Pip - "Let 'Em Come" from Distraction Pieces (2011)
 B. Dolan - "Film the Police", "Bad Things" & "2Bad" from House of Bees Vol. 2 (2012)

Compilation appearances
 "Garden Gnomes" on Lexoleum (2003)
 "Crack Pipes" on Anticon Label Sampler: 1999-2004 (2004)
 "Waterline" on Pride and Glory (2008)
 "Makeshift Patriot" on Punk-O-Rama 8 (2003)

Other
 Home Grown Demo Tape (1996)
 Voice Mail Bomb Threat (1998) with Art Official Intelligence
 Human the Death Dance Instrumentals (2007)

References

Discographies of American artists
Hip hop discographies